Gita Kalmet (until 1987, Gita Ränk; born on 29 November 1959 in Tallinn) is an Estonian diplomat and former actress.

In 1984, she graduated from Tallinn State Conservatory Stage Art Department. In 1993 she graduated from Estonian School of Diplomacy.

From 1984 to 1989, she worked at Rakvere Theatre. Besides theatre roles she played also in several films and on television.

Since 1993, she is working for the Estonian Foreign Ministry. From 2006 until 2011, she was Ambassador of Estonia to the Netherlands. Since 2013 she was Ambassador of Estonia to Canada and since August 2021 to the Czech Republic.

She is married to director and actor Madis Kalmet. The couple have two sons, actors Henrik Kalmet and Karl-Andreas Kalmet.

Filmography

 1989: Ma pole turist, ma elan siin
 1992: Hotell E
 1993: Candles in the Dark  
 1993: Marraskuun harmaa valo
 1999: Kass kukub käppadele

References

External links

Living people
1959 births
Estonian stage actresses
Estonian film actresses
Estonian television actresses
20th-century Estonian actresses
Ambassadors of Estonia to the Netherlands
Ambassadors of Estonia to Canada
Ambassadors of Estonia to the Czech Republic
Estonian women diplomats
Estonian Academy of Music and Theatre alumni
Actresses from Tallinn